Let the Balloon Go is a 1976 Australian children's film about a young boy with polio in 1917.

Plot
In 1917  rural New South Wales, a young boy with polio struggles to break free of his overprotective mother.

Cast
Robert Bettles as John Sumner
Jan Kingsbury as Mrs Sumner
John Ewart as Constable Baird
Bruce Spence as Acting Fire Chief Gifford
Ray Barrett as Dr McLeod

Production
The film was shot near the town of Carcoar.

Reception
The film sold widely overseas including to the United States.

References

External links
Let the Balloon Go at IMDb
Let the Balloon Go at Oz Movies

Australian children's films
Films directed by Oliver Howes
1970s English-language films
1970s Australian films